Clare Pauline Abbott ( Hinshelwood, born 5 July 1921) is a South African wildlife artist and illustrator. Although native to England, she settled in South Africa and produced detailed natural history paintings that were used in numerous publications. She also redesigned the colour plates for the American edition of Rowland Ward's book of big game records.

Works

References

External links 
 Fernkloof Natural Reserve — with Abbott's illustrations

1921 births
Possibly living people
20th-century South African women artists
21st-century South African women artists
South African women illustrators
South African illustrators
British emigrants to South Africa